Kim Jin-tae (born 13 October 1964) is a politician who is the Governor of Gangwon Province.  He previously was a prosecutor. He was a member of the National Assembly from 2012 to 2020.

Early life 
Kim Jin-tae was born on 13 October 1964 in Chuncheon, Gangwon Province. He entered Seoul National University School of Law in 1983.

Early career 
Kim passed the 28th judicial examination in 1986. He was after completing the 18th Judicial Research and Training Institute and commissioned as a prosecutor in 1992, he served as the director of the planning department of the Judicial Research and Training Institute and the director of the Organized Crime Division of the Supreme Prosecutors' Office. In 2009, he ended his official career as the chief of the Wonju Public Prosecutor's Office, and opened up as a lawyer in Wonju.

Political career 
Kim was nominated by the Saenuri Party in the 2012 legislative election and was elected in Chuncheon, Gangwon Province. In February 2016, he announced his candidacy for the 2016 legislative election and won the nomination of the Saenuri Party to win re-election by defeating the Democratic Party candidate Heo Young.

On 14 March 2017, he announced that he would run for presidential election. However, he was defeated by Hong Jun-pyo in the Liberty Korea Party presidential primary.

References

External links 
 

1964 births
Living people
People from Chuncheon
Members of the National Assembly (South Korea)
Liberty Korea Party politicians
Seoul National University School of Law alumni
20th-century South Korean lawyers
South Korean Methodists
South Korean prosecutors
People Power Party (South Korea) politicians
21st-century South Korean lawyers
Governors of Gangwon Province